Memory Lane Arcade was an arcade amusement park located in Frankenmuth, Michigan. It was opened on April 29, 1975 by Dennis Atkinson and his wife Irene. It closed on November 28, 2004. It is notable for its collection of old-fashioned activities, including coin-operated fortune tellers, arcade games, roll-playing instruments and attractions. Many games were pretty cheap to play.

Highlights
 200 year-old Orchestrion
 Buzzy Buzzy Bee
 Grandmothers Predictions
 Laffing Sal
 Mystic Swami

References

External links
Official website

1975 establishments in Michigan
Defunct amusement parks in Michigan
Entertainment companies established in 1975
Entertainment companies disestablished in 2004